Jérémy Chardy won the title, defeating Daniel Gimeno-Traver 6–1, 5–7, 7–6(7–3) in the final.

Seeds

Draw

Finals

Top half

Bottom half

References
 Main Draw
 Qualifying Draw

Singles